Byczyna  (Latin: Bicina, Bicinium) is a town in Kluczbork County, Opole Voivodeship, Poland, with 3,490 inhabitants as of December 2021.

History
The town of Byczyna was first mention in 1054 when it temporarily served as the capital of the Bishopric of Wrocław. Its name is of Polish origin. It was part of Poland and during its fragmentation period it was part of the duchies of Silesia, Głogów and Namysłów, before it was again under direct rule of Polish King Casimir III the Great from 1341 to 1348. It was granted town rights before 1268. In 1356 it passed to the Czech Crown Lands, and it soon returned under the rule of local Polish dukes of the Piast dynasty, as part of the duchies of Świdnica, Opole, Brzeg, Oleśnica, again Brzeg, Opole and finally Legnica until 1675. Afterwards it was incorporated into the Habsburg-ruled Czech Kingdom. It was a border town, located near Poland.

The Battle of Byczyna took place nearby between Maximilian III, Archduke of Austria, who was elected as king of Poland, and Sigismund III Vasa who also was elected as king, on January 24, 1588. Maximilian was defeated. He surrendered and went to imprisonment. The German author Gustav Freytag reports in his memories about yearly border violations at Byczyna. During the Thirty Years' War the town was occupied by the Saxons in 1633 and Swedes in 1646. In the 16th century, a Polish school was established, which flourished in the 17th century, and from 1657 to 1661 its rector was Byczyna-born Polish scholar and translator John Herbinius.

After the Prussian annexation in 1742, Byczyna, under the Germanized name Pitschen, entered a period of Germanisation, and the local school slowly diminished. In 1757 the town suffered the largest fire in its history. Despite those circumstances, in the 19th century, the town was still largely inhabited by Poles. After World War I and the rebirth of independent Poland, Germany introduced a number of restrictions, including a state of emergency, to hinder the self-organization of local Poles. In the interwar period the town remained part of Germany. In September 1939, Germany, invaded Poland also from Pitschen, sparking World War II. After the defeat of Nazi Germany in 1945, Byczyna was reintegrated with Poland.

Notable people
, medieval Polish writer, author or co-author of the 14th-century Polish chronicle Chronica principum Poloniae
Eliasz Kreczmar (von Löven), physician and astronomer, married Maria Cunitz
Maria Cunitz (1610–1664), astronomer, died at Pitschem
Jan Herbinius (1627–1679), Polish scholar and translator
Adam Quasius (1673–1736), theologian and Deacon at St. Elisabeth Church in Wrocław
Piotr Steinkeller (1799–1854), industrialist, "Polish King of Zinc", exploited local ore deposits
Jan Dzierżon (1811–1906), pioneering Polish apiarist, attended school in Byczyna
Martin Kutta (1867–1944), mathematician

Twin towns – sister cities
See twin towns of Gmina Byczyna.

Gallery

References

External links
Map of Silesia 1600, Pitzen north of Creiteberg in Ducatus Bregensis
 Jewish Community in Byczyna on Virtual Shtetl

Cities in Silesia
Cities and towns in Opole Voivodeship
Kluczbork County